Bicyclus sandace, the dark vulgar bush brown, is a butterfly in the family Nymphalidae. It is found in Senegal, the Gambia, Guinea, Burkina Faso, Sierra Leone, Liberia, Ivory Coast, Ghana, Togo, Benin, Nigeria, Cameroon, Bioko, the Republic of the Congo, the Central African Republic, Angola, the Democratic Republic of the Congo, Uganda, Ethiopia, western Kenya, western Tanzania and Zambia. The habitat consists of lowland and sub-montane forests.

Adults are attracted to fermented fruit.

The larvae feed on Poaceae species.

References

Elymniini
Butterflies described in 1877
Butterflies of Africa
Taxa named by William Chapman Hewitson